The 2000 WNBA season was the second for the Minnesota Lynx franchise. They were close to making the WNBA Playoffs, but came up short for the second consecutive year.

Offseason
Angela Aycock and Charmin Smith were both picked up by the Seattle Storm in the 2000 WNBA Expansion Draft.

WNBA Draft

Trades

Regular season

Season standings

Season schedule

Player stats

References

Minnesota Lynx seasons
Minnesota
Minnesota Lynx